Juan Manuel Navarrete (born 20 February 1988 in Sastre, Santa Fe) is an Argentine football midfielder who currently plays for amateur club Club Atlético San Jorge in Argentina. He played one match in the Primera B Nacional during the 2008/09 season.

References

External links

1988 births
Living people
Argentine footballers
Association football midfielders
Atlético de Rafaela footballers
9 de Julio de Rafaela players
Sportspeople from Santa Fe Province